Calvert Magruder (December 26, 1893 – May 22, 1968) was a United States circuit judge of the United States Court of Appeals for the First Circuit.

Education and career

Born on December 26, 1893, in Annapolis, Maryland, received an Artium Baccalaureus degree in 1913 and an Artium Magister degree in 1917 from the Annapolis campus of St. John's College. He received a Bachelor of Laws in 1916 from Harvard Law School. He was a law clerk for Associate Justice Louis Brandeis of the Supreme Court of the United States from 1916 to 1917. He served as a infantry lieutenant in the United States Army from 1917 to 1919, during World War I. He was an attorney for the United States Shipping Board from 1919 to 1920. He was a faculty member of Harvard Law School from 1920 to 1939 and again from 1947 to 1959, as an assistant professor of law from 1920 to 1925, professor of law from 1925 to 1932, vice dean from 1930 to 1939 and as a lecturer from 1947 to 1959. He was general counsel for the National Labor Relations Board from 1934 to 1935. He was general counsel for the Wage and Hour Division of the United States Department of Labor from 1938 to 1939.

Federal judicial service

Magruder was nominated by President Franklin D. Roosevelt on April 24, 1939, to a seat on the United States Court of Appeals for the First Circuit vacated by Judge George Hutchins Bingham. He was confirmed by the United States Senate on June 1, 1939, and received his commission on June 3, 1939. He served as a Judge of the Emergency Court of Appeals from 1942 to 1962. He served as Chief Judge from 1948 to 1959. He was a member of the Conference of Senior Circuit Judges (now the Judicial Conference of the United States) from 1940 to 1948, and a member of the Judicial Conference of the United States from 1948 to 1959. He assumed senior status on June 12, 1959. His service terminated on May 22, 1968, due to his death. He died at the age of 74 and was living in Newton, Massachusetts at the time of his death

Other service

Magruder was a lecturer at the University of California, Hastings College of the Law from 1959 to 1960, Columbia University from 1960 to 1961, Ohio State University in 1961, and the University of Puerto Rico in 1962.

See also 
 Commissioner v. Boylston Market Ass'n
 List of law clerks of the Supreme Court of the United States (Seat 4)

References

Sources

External links

1893 births
1968 deaths
Judges of the United States Court of Appeals for the First Circuit
United States court of appeals judges appointed by Franklin D. Roosevelt
20th-century American judges
Harvard University alumni
Law clerks of the Supreme Court of the United States
Harvard Law School faculty